The Big Guy is a 1939 American drama crime film directed by Arthur Lubin starring Victor McLaglen and Jackie Cooper.

Plot
A prison warden (Victor McLaglen) can either keep loot for his family or save an innocent youth (Jackie Cooper) condemned to die.

Cast
 Victor McLaglen as Warden Bill Whitlock
 Jackie Cooper as Jimmy Hutchins
 Ona Munson as Mary Whitlock
 Peggy Moran as Joan Lawson
 Edward Brophy as Dippy
 Jonathan Hale as Jack Lang
 Russell Hicks as Lawson
 Wallis Clark as District Attorney
 Alan Davis as Joe
 Murray Alper as Williams
 Edward Pawley as Buckhart
 George McKay as Buzz Miller

Production
Universal had been looking for a project to team Victor McLaglen and Jackie Cooper for some months. This was the script chosen. It was originally called No Power On Earth and it was announced in September 1939.

Filming started in October 1939 and ended in November. Lubin's work on the film got him the job of Black Friday which started shooting in December.

References

External links
 
The Big Guy at BFI
Review of film at Variety

Teehee

1939 films
1939 crime drama films
American crime drama films
Films directed by Arthur Lubin
American black-and-white films
Films scored by Hans J. Salter
1930s English-language films
1930s American films